John Jackson Longstaff Bradbury (born 1878, date of death unknown) was an English footballer. An outside right, he made 57 appearances in The Football League, scoring 7 goals, for Lincoln City, Blackburn Rovers, Derby County, Barnsley and Bristol City.

References

1878 births
Year of death missing
English Football League players
Gillingham F.C. players
Millwall F.C. players
Lincoln City F.C. players
Blackburn Rovers F.C. players
Derby County F.C. players
Barnsley F.C. players
Bristol City F.C. players
Carlisle United F.C. players
Stockport County F.C. players
English footballers
Association football outside forwards